Anthomyiopsis nigra is a species of fly first described by Baranov in 1938. It is part of the genus Anthomyiopsis and the family Tachinidae. It is distributed in Uttar Pradesh, India. No subspecies are listed in the Catalogue of Life.

References

Tachininae
Insects described in 1838